Operation Foxrock was a planned raid by British Commandos during the Second World War.

Following the success of St Nazaire raid a similar raid was planned for June 1942 on St Valery-en-Caux. The raiding force were 100 men from No. 12 Commando were to destroy dock gates and other installations. The raid was abandoned due to the convoy being discovered by German Naval forces.

References

Conflicts in 1942
World War II British Commando raids
1942 in France
Cancelled military operations involving the United Kingdom
Cancelled special forces operations